Wolfgang Solz (12 February 1940 – 24 March 2017) was a German professional football winger.

Eintracht Frankfurt
The youth internationalist moved from Union Niederrad to Eintracht Frankfurt in 1958. The first season he had to spend in the youth team due to transfer regulations. From the 1959–60 campaign on, Solz was an Oberliga team member. On 6 December 1959 he debuted as left winger against SSV Reutlingen. For the European Cup final match in Glasgow against Real Madrid on 18 May 1960 he was benched. Because of his excellent technique he was called "Brasilianer", Brazilian. From 1959 until 1963 he appeared in 69 Oberliga matches, netting 17 goals and contributed to the runner-up titles in 1961 and 1962 in the Oberliga Süd. In the 1963 founded Bundesliga he gathered 46 goals in 113 matches.  In the Inter-Cities Fairs Cup, Solz experienced international flair in 1964–65 and 1966–67. His last Bundesliga appearance was a 0–0 draw at Schalke 04 on 25 May 1968.

SV Darmstadt 98
After his departure from Eintracht Frankfurt, Solz signed at SV Darmstadt 98 where he stayed from 1968 until 1971. The first two rounds  in the Regionalliga Süd as a player Spieler, the 1970–71 season as a player-manager in the amateur league Hessen. He won the championship with the Lilies, leading them back to the Regionalliga.

SpVgg Bad Homburg
As 33-year-old player-manager, Solz won the German amateur championship with SpVgg Bad Homburg against the 1. FC Kaiserslautern amateurs on 30 June 1973.

Manager
After eleven honours won in the amateur tiers, he retired his manager career FSV Frankfurt in 1989. He had a reputation as a sound manager and had some success with Viktoria Aschaffenburg, VfR Bürstadt, FC Erbach, RW Frankfurt, Borussia Fulda und Hanau 93.

National team
Solz gained his first cap in the pre-Bundesliga time. On 24 October 1962, the winger played together with the ones of Uwe Seeler, Heinz Strehl and Friedhelm Konietzka in Stuttgart against France when the match ended 2–2. After 1962 FIFA World Cup in Chile, Bundestrainer Sepp Herberger had to re-build the team and the 22-year-old Frankfurt native received the chance to play for Germany. His second match for the national team was on 29 April 1964 in Ludwigshafen at the 3–4 loss against Czechoslovakia. He formed the left wing together with Wolfgang Overath but was not capped again. In acceleration he was not an excessively pacy winger and on the playmaker position Helmut Haller, Wolfgang Overath and Günter Netzer could not be pushed away.

Profession
The former bureau employee founded an insurance agency in Frankfurt.

Honours 
 European Cup: runners-up 1959–60
 Oberliga Süd: runners-up 1960–61, 1961–62
 DFB-Pokal: runners-up 1963–64
 UEFA Intertoto Cup: 1966–67

External links
Wolfgang Solz at eintracht-archiv.de

1940 births
2017 deaths
German footballers
Germany international footballers
Footballers from Frankfurt
Eintracht Frankfurt players
Bundesliga players
Viktoria Aschaffenburg managers
Association football wingers
German football managers